The 1988–89 NBA season was the Mavericks' 9th season in the NBA. After reaching the Conference Finals last year, the Mavericks got off to a fast start winning 9 of their first 12 games, but after a 17–9 start, they went on a 7-game losing streak in January, and held a 24–21 record at the All-Star break. In January, sixth man Roy Tarpley was suspended indefinitely for violating the league's anti-drug policy after only playing just 19 games.

At midseason, the team traded All-Star forward Mark Aguirre, who had several incidents with the team during the season, to the Detroit Pistons in exchange for former All-Star forward Adrian Dantley, and dealt Detlef Schrempf to the Indiana Pacers in exchange for Herb Williams. Aguirre would win a championship with the Pistons, as they defeated the defending champion Los Angeles Lakers in four straight games in the NBA Finals.

After hovering a few games over .500 for most of the season, the Mavericks collapsed and suffered a 12-game losing streak in March that sealed their fate for the entire season. The Mavericks finished the season fourth in the Midwest Division with a 38–44 record. It was the first time since 1983 that the team did not make the playoffs.

Rolando Blackman averaged 19.7 points per game, while Derek Harper averaged 17.3 points, 7.0 assists and 2.1 steals per game, and Sam Perkins provided the team with 15.0 points and 8.8 rebounds per game. In addition, Tarpley contributed 17.3 points, 11.5 rebounds and 1.6 blocks per game, and James Donaldson provided with 9.1 points, 10.8 rebounds and 1.5 blocks per game, but only played 53 games due to a knee injury.

Draft picks

Roster

Regular season

Season standings

z - clinched division title
y - clinched division title
x - clinched playoff spot

Record vs. opponents

Game log

|- align="center" bgcolor="#ffcccc"
| 1
| November 4, 1988
| L.A. Lakers
| L 113–116
|
|
|
| Reunion Arena
| 0–1
|- align="center" bgcolor="#ccffcc"
| 2
| November 5, 1988
| @ Houston
| W 114–113 (OT)
|
|
|
| The Summit
| 1–1
|- align="center" bgcolor="#ccffcc"
| 3
| November 8, 1988
| Miami
| W 92–88
|
|
|
| Reunion Arena
| 2–1
|- align="center" bgcolor="#ffcccc"
| 4
| November 9, 1988
| @ Phoenix
| L 103–111
|
|
|
| Arizona Veterans Memorial Coliseum
| 2–2
|- align="center" bgcolor="#ccffcc"
| 5
| November 11, 1988
| San Antonio
| W 115–102
|
|
|
| Reunion Arena
| 3–2
|- align="center" bgcolor="#ccffcc"
| 6
| November 12, 1988
| Sacramento
| W 111–71
|
|
|
| Reunion Arena
| 4–2
|- align="center" bgcolor="#ffcccc"
| 7
| November 15, 1988
| Detroit
| L 99–108
|
|
|
| Reunion Arena
| 4–3
|- align="center" bgcolor="#ccffcc"
| 8
| November 17, 1988
| Charlotte
| W 105–93
|
|
|
| Reunion Arena
| 5–3
|- align="center" bgcolor="#ccffcc"
| 9
| November 19, 1988
| @ Seattle
| W 112–106
|
|
|
| Seattle Center Coliseum
| 6–3
|- align="center" bgcolor="#ccffcc"
| 10
| November 23, 1988
| Denver
| W 125–106
|
|
|
| Reunion Arena
| 7–3
|- align="center" bgcolor="#ccffcc"
| 11
| November 25, 1988
| Atlanta
| W 100–95
|
|
|
| Reunion Arena
| 8–3
|- align="center" bgcolor="#ccffcc"
| 12
| November 26, 1988
| Utah
| W 113–93
|
|
|
| Reunion Arena
| 9–3
|- align="center" bgcolor="#ffcccc"
| 13
| November 30, 1988
| Houston
| L 89–101
|
|
|
| Reunion Arena
| 9–4

|- align="center" bgcolor="#ffcccc"
| 14
| December 2, 1988
| New York
| L 101–104
|
|
|
| Reunion Arena
| 9–5
|- align="center" bgcolor="#ffcccc"
| 15
| December 3, 1988
| Chicago
| L 100–113
|
|
|
| Reunion Arena
| 9–6
|- align="center" bgcolor="#ccffcc"
| 16
| December 7, 1988
| Seattle
| W 102–98
|
|
|
| Reunion Arena
| 10–6
|- align="center" bgcolor="#ccffcc"
| 17
| December 9, 1988
| @ Utah
| W 97–89
|
|
|
| Salt Palace
| 11–6
|- align="center" bgcolor="#ffcccc"
| 18
| December 10, 1988
| Cleveland
| L 98–102
|
|
|
| Reunion Arena
| 11–7
|- align="center" bgcolor="#ccffcc"
| 19
| December 13, 1988
| Golden State
| W 117–111
|
|
|
| Reunion Arena
| 12–7
|- align="center" bgcolor="#ccffcc"
| 20
| December 16, 1988
| @ Charlotte
| W 107–98
|
|
|
| Charlotte Coliseum
| 13–7
|- align="center" bgcolor="#ccffcc"
| 21
| December 17, 1988
| @ Miami
| W 104–87
|
|
|
| Miami Arena
| 14–7
|- align="center" bgcolor="#ccffcc"
| 22
| December 20, 1988
| @ Philadelphia
| W 108–102
|
|
|
| The Spectrum
| 15–7
|- align="center" bgcolor="#ffcccc"
| 23
| December 21, 1988
| @ New Jersey
| L 120–122 (OT)
|
|
|
| Brendan Byrne Arena
| 15–8
|- align="center" bgcolor="#ffcccc"
| 24
| December 23, 1988
| @ Milwaukee
| L 101–113
|
|
|
| Bradley Center
| 15–9
|- align="center" bgcolor="#ccffcc"
| 25
| December 27, 1988
| San Antonio
| W 110–101
|
|
|
| Reunion Arena
| 16–9
|- align="center" bgcolor="#ccffcc"
| 26
| December 29, 1988
| Boston
| W 131–115
|
|
|
| Reunion Arena
| 17–9

|- align="center" bgcolor="#ffcccc"
| 27
| January 3, 1989
| @ Sacramento
| L 96–123
|
|
|
| ARCO Arena
| 17–10
|- align="center" bgcolor="#ffcccc"
| 28
| January 6, 1989
| @ Phoenix
| L 111–120
|
|
|
| Arizona Veterans Memorial Coliseum
| 17–11
|- align="center" bgcolor="#ffcccc"
| 29
| January 7, 1989
| @ Denver
| L 94–115
|
|
|
| McNichols Sports Arena
| 17–12
|- align="center" bgcolor="#ffcccc"
| 30
| January 9, 1989
| Philadelphia
| L 103–121
|
|
|
| Reunion Arena
| 17–13
|- align="center" bgcolor="#ffcccc"
| 31
| January 11, 1989
| @ Golden State
| L 106–107
|
|
|
| Oakland-Alameda County Coliseum Arena
| 17–14
|- align="center" bgcolor="#ffcccc"
| 32
| January 12, 1989
| @ Seattle
| L 95–130
|
|
|
| Seattle Center Coliseum
| 17–15
|- align="center" bgcolor="#ffcccc"
| 33
| January 14, 1989
| @ Houston
| L 98–110
|
|
|
| The Summit
| 17–16
|- align="center" bgcolor="#ccffcc"
| 34
| January 15, 1989
| Portland
| W 111–108
|
|
|
| Reunion Arena
| 18–16
|- align="center" bgcolor="#ccffcc"
| 35
| January 18, 1989
| Denver
| W 102–92
|
|
|
| Reunion Arena
| 19–16
|- align="center" bgcolor="#ffcccc"
| 36
| January 20, 1989
| @ L.A. Lakers
| L 99–115
|
|
|
| Great Western Forum
| 19–17
|- align="center" bgcolor="#ffcccc"
| 37
| January 24, 1989
| @ Chicago
| L 91–109
|
|
|
| Chicago Stadium
| 19–18
|- align="center" bgcolor="#ccffcc"
| 38
| January 25, 1989
| L.A. Clippers
| W 117–98
|
|
|
| Reunion Arena
| 20–18
|- align="center" bgcolor="#ccffcc"
| 39
| January 27, 1989
| San Antonio
| W 126–82
|
|
|
| Reunion Arena
| 21–18
|- align="center" bgcolor="#ffcccc"
| 40
| January 29, 1989
| L.A. Lakers
| L 93–118
|
|
|
| Reunion Arena
| 21–19
|- align="center" bgcolor="#ffcccc"
| 41
| January 31, 1989
| Utah
| L 84–99
|
|
|
| Reunion Arena
| 21–20

|- align="center" bgcolor="#ccffcc"
| 42
| February 3, 1989
| Phoenix
| W 121–117
|
|
|
| Reunion Arena
| 22–20
|- align="center" bgcolor="#ccffcc"
| 43
| February 6, 1989
| @ L.A. Clippers
| W 129–111
|
|
|
| Los Angeles Memorial Sports Arena
| 23–20
|- align="center" bgcolor="#ffcccc"
| 44
| February 7, 1989
| @ Portland
| L 125–134
|
|
|
| Memorial Coliseum
| 23–21
|- align="center" bgcolor="#ccffcc"
| 45
| February 9, 1989
| @ Utah
| W 94–87
|
|
|
| Salt Palace
| 24–21
|- align="center" bgcolor="#ccffcc"
| 46
| February 14, 1989
| L.A. Clippers
| W 117–98
|
|
|
| Reunion Arena
| 25–21
|- align="center" bgcolor="#ccffcc"
| 47
| February 16, 1989
| Miami
| W 93–80
|
|
|
| Reunion Arena
| 26–21
|- align="center" bgcolor="#ffcccc"
| 48
| February 18, 1989
| Houston
| L 94–105
|
|
|
| Reunion Arena
| 26–22
|- align="center" bgcolor="#ccffcc"
| 49
| February 20, 1989
| @ San Antonio
| W 105–93
|
|
|
| HemisFair Arena
| 27–22
|- align="center" bgcolor="#ffcccc"
| 50
| February 22, 1989
| @ Denver
| L 106–109
|
|
|
| McNichols Sports Arena
| 27–23
|- align="center" bgcolor="#ffcccc"
| 51
| February 24, 1989
| Golden State
| L 92–127
|
|
|
| Reunion Arena
| 27–24
|- align="center" bgcolor="#ccffcc"
| 52
| February 25, 1989
| Washington
| W 127–93
|
|
|
| Reunion Arena
| 28–24
|- align="center" bgcolor="#ffcccc"
| 53
| February 27, 1989
| @ Atlanta
| L 83–105
|
|
|
| The Omni
| 28–25
|- align="center" bgcolor="#ccffcc"
| 54
| February 28, 1989
| @ Miami
| W 111–110 (OT)
|
|
|
| Miami Arena
| 29–25

|- align="center" bgcolor="#ffcccc"
| 55
| March 3, 1989
| @ Boston
| L 106–107
|
|
|
| Boston Garden
| 29–26
|- align="center" bgcolor="#ffcccc"
| 56
| March 4, 1989
| @ Washington
| L 105–119
|
|
|
| Capital Centre
| 29–27
|- align="center" bgcolor="#ccffcc"
| 57
| March 6, 1989
| New Jersey
| W 105–99
|
|
|
| Reunion Arena
| 30–27
|- align="center" bgcolor="#ccffcc"
| 58
| March 8, 1989
| Portland
| W 99–92
|
|
|
| Reunion Arena
| 31–27
|- align="center" bgcolor="#ffcccc"
| 59
| March 10, 1989
| @ Houston
| L 86–96
|
|
|
| The Summit
| 31–28
|- align="center" bgcolor="#ffcccc"
| 60
| March 11, 1989
| @ San Antonio
| L 90–97
|
|
|
| HemisFair Arena
| 31–29
|- align="center" bgcolor="#ffcccc"
| 61
| March 13, 1989
| Milwaukee
| L 95–111
|
|
|
| Reunion Arena
| 31–30
|- align="center" bgcolor="#ffcccc"
| 62
| March 15, 1989
| @ Golden State
| L 100–113
|
|
|
| Oakland-Alameda County Coliseum Arena
| 31–31
|- align="center" bgcolor="#ffcccc"
| 63
| March 17, 1989
| @ L.A. Lakers
| L 103–106
|
|
|
| Great Western Forum
| 31–32
|- align="center" bgcolor="#ffcccc"
| 64
| March 18, 1989
| @ Sacramento
| L 90–100
|
|
|
| ARCO Arena
| 31–33
|- align="center" bgcolor="#ffcccc"
| 65
| March 20, 1989
| @ Portland
| L 91–112
|
|
|
| Memorial Coliseum
| 31–34
|- align="center" bgcolor="#ffcccc"
| 66
| March 22, 1989
| @ L.A. Clippers
| L 112–116
|
|
|
| Los Angeles Memorial Sports Arena
| 31–35
|- align="center" bgcolor="#ffcccc"
| 67
| March 24, 1989
| Denver
| L 105–114
|
|
|
| Reunion Arena
| 31–36
|- align="center" bgcolor="#ffcccc"
| 68
| March 27, 1989
| @ Detroit
| L 77–90
|
|
|
| The Palace of Auburn Hills
| 31–37
|- align="center" bgcolor="#ffcccc"
| 69
| March 28, 1989
| @ Cleveland
| L 90–102
|
|
|
| Richfield Coliseum
| 31–38
|- align="center" bgcolor="#ffcccc"
| 70
| March 30, 1989
| @ New York
| L 98–99
|
|
|
| Madison Square Garden
| 31–39
|- align="center" bgcolor="#ccffcc"
| 71
| March 31, 1989
| @ Indiana
| W 105–102
|
|
|
| Market Square Arena
| 32–39

|- align="center" bgcolor="#ccffcc"
| 72
| April 2, 1989
| Miami
| W 98–96
|
|
|
| Reunion Arena
| 33–39
|- align="center" bgcolor="#ffcccc"
| 73
| April 4, 1989
| @ Utah
| L 80–95
|
|
|
| Salt Palace
| 33–40
|- align="center" bgcolor="#ccffcc"
| 74
| April 7, 1989
| Sacramento
| W 115–102
|
|
|
| Reunion Arena
| 34–40
|- align="center" bgcolor="#ffcccc"
| 75
| April 8, 1989
| Seattle
| L 90–114
|
|
|
| Reunion Arena
| 34–41
|- align="center" bgcolor="#ffcccc"
| 76
| April 10, 1989
| Indiana
| L 103–110
|
|
|
| Reunion Arena
| 34–42
|- align="center" bgcolor="#ffcccc"
| 77
| April 12, 1989
| Phoenix
| L 94–109
|
|
|
| Reunion Arena
| 34–43
|- align="center" bgcolor="#ccffcc"
| 78
| April 14, 1989
| @ San Antonio
| W 118–110
|
|
|
| HemisFair Arena
| 35–43
|- align="center" bgcolor="#ffcccc"
| 79
| April 16, 1989
| Houston
| L 112–114 (OT)
|
|
|
| Reunion Arena
| 35–44
|- align="center" bgcolor="#ccffcc"
| 80
| April 18, 1989
| @ Miami
| W 103–99
|
|
|
| Miami Arena
| 36–44
|- align="center" bgcolor="#ccffcc"
| 81
| April 21, 1989
| Utah
| W 91–89
|
|
|
| Reunion Arena
| 37–44
|- align="center" bgcolor="#ccffcc"
| 82
| April 23, 1989
| @ Denver
| W 113–96
|
|
|
| McNichols Sports Arena
| 38–44

Player statistics

|-
| 
|| 44 || 44 || 34.8 || .450 || .239 || .730 || 5.3 || 4.3 || 0.7 || 0.7 || style="background:#0B60AD;color:#FFFFFF;" | 21.7
|-
| 
|| 9 || 0 || 4.2 || .273 || .000 || .500 || 0.3 || 1.0 || 0.1 || 0.0 || 0.8
|-
| 
|| 37 || 0 || 5.6 || .462 || || .800 || 1.2 || 0.3 || 0.1 || 0.4 || 1.8
|-
| 
|| 78 || 78 || style="background:#0B60AD;color:#FFFFFF;" | 37.8 || .476 || .353 || .854 || 3.5 || 3.7 || 0.8 || 0.3 || 19.7
|-
| 
|| 31 || 25 || 34.9 || .462 || .000 || .776 || 4.9 || 2.5 || 0.6 || 0.2 || 20.3
|-
| 
|| 78 || 4 || 17.9 || .483 || .314 || .805 || 1.4 || 3.1 || 0.6 || 0.2 || 6.4
|-
| 
|| 53 || 53 || 32.9 || style="background:#0B60AD;color:#FFFFFF;" | .573 || || .766 || 10.8 || 0.7 || 0.5 || 1.5 || 9.1
|-
| 
|| 81 || style="background:#0B60AD;color:#FFFFFF;" | 81 || 36.6 || .477 || style="background:#0B60AD;color:#FFFFFF;" | .356 || .806 || 2.8 || style="background:#0B60AD;color:#FFFFFF;" | 7.0 || style="background:#0B60AD;color:#FFFFFF;" | 2.1 || 0.5 || 17.3
|-
| 
|| 25 || 0 || 5.2 || .375 || .267 || style="background:#0B60AD;color:#FFFFFF;" | .857 || 0.8 || 0.5 || 0.4 || 0.1 || 2.6
|-
| 
|| 78 || 77 || 36.5 || .464 || .184 || .833 || 8.8 || 1.6 || 1.0 || 1.2 || 15.0
|-
| 
|| 37 || 1 || 22.8 || .426 || .125 || .789 || 4.5 || 2.3 || 0.6 || 0.2 || 9.5
|-
| 
|| 19 || 6 || 31.1 || .541 || .000 || .688 || style="background:#0B60AD;color:#FFFFFF;" | 11.5 || 0.9 || 1.5 || 1.6 || 17.3
|-
| 
|| 70 || 11 || 15.1 || .469 || .111 || .758 || 3.0 || 0.6 || 0.3 || 0.6 || 5.5
|-
| 
|| 65 || 9 || 16.5 || .433 || .111 || .744 || 4.4 || 0.7 || 0.2 || 0.5 || 4.6
|-
| 
|| 51 || 1 || 8.0 || .404 || .250 || .813 || 0.9 || 1.5 || 0.5 || 0.1 || 2.2
|-
| 
|| 30 || 20 || 30.1 || .396 || .000 || .632 || 6.6 || 1.2 || 0.5 || style="background:#0B60AD;color:#FFFFFF;" | 1.8 || 6.6
|}

Awards and records

Transactions

References

See also
 1988-89 NBA season

Dallas Mavericks seasons
Dallas
Dallas
Dallas